The 2000 Peterborough City Council election took place on 4 May 2000 to elect members of Peterborough City Council in England. This was on the same day as other local elections.

Election result

Ward results

Barnack

Central

Dogsthorpe

East

Fletton

North

North Bretton

Orton Longueville

Orton Waterville

Park

Paston

Ravensthorpe

South

South Bretton

Stanground

Walton

Werrington North

Werrington South

West

References

2000
2000s in Cambridgeshire
Peterborough